Dhobaha is a village in West Champaran district in the Indian state of Bihar.

Demographics
As of 2011 India census, Dhobaha had a population of 5822 in 965 households. Males constitute 51.33% of the population and females 48.66%. Dhobaha has an average literacy rate of 29.37%, lower than the national average of 74%: male literacy is 63.68%, and female literacy is 36.31%. In Dhobaha, 23.2% of the population is under 6 years of age.

References

Villages in West Champaran district